Aidan Walsh (born 23 January 1990) is an Irish hurler and Gaelic footballer who plays for Cork Championship club Kanturk and at inter-county level with the Cork senior hurling team. He usually lines out as a full-forward.

Playing career

Cork Institute of Technology

In 2011, he helped the Cork Institute of Technology hurling team to their first county final where they played Carrigtwohill. Despite being favourites for the game Carrigtwohill ran out 0–15 to 1–11 winners. Then the GAA barred Walsh, as well as goalkeeper Michael Boyle, from playing for DCU in controversial circumstances.

Kanturk

Walsh joined the Kanturk club at a young age and played in all grades at juvenile and underage levels as a dual player. His early successes included winning Duhallow Championship titles in 2009 and 2011 after defeats of Rockchapel.

On 11 November 2011, Walsh was at midfield for the Kanturk junior football team that faced Mitchelstown in the final of Cork Junior Championship. He was held scoreless in the game but collected a winners' medal after the 1-20 to 0-04 victory. He ended the game as man of the match.

On 3 November 2013, Walsh was at right wing-forward when the Kanturk intermediate hurling team faced Éire Óg in the final of the Cork Intermediate Championship. He scored 1-01 from play in the 2-22 to 1-12 victory.

The 2017-18 season proved to be a hugely successful one for Walsh and the Kanturk club. After claiming a Cork Premier Intermediate Championship medal with the hurling team following a two-point defeat of Mallow in the final, he later won a Cork Intermediate Championship medal as a footballer following a 0-14 to 0-13 defeat of Mitchelstown in the final. On 19 November 2017, Walsh won a Munster Championship medal with the hurlers after a 1-23 to 0-25 extra-time defeat of Kilmaley in the final. On 4 February 2018, he won an All-Ireland medal after scoring two points in a 1-18 to 1-17 defeat of St Patrick's Ballyragget in the final.

Cork

Minor and under-21

Walsh first played for Cork as a member of the minor football team. He made his first appearance on 11 April 2007 and scored six points from right wing-forward in a 0-20 to 0-03 defeat of Waterford. On 1 July, Walsh won a Munster Championship medal after scoring three points in a 1-16 to 2-08 defeat of Kerry in the final.

Walsh became a dual player at minor level in 2008. He made his first appearance for the Cork minor hurling team when he lined out at midfield in a 2-17 to 2-16 defeat by Clare on 30 April 2008. In spite of this defeat, Cork still reached the provincial decider via the play-off route. Walsh was switched to right wing-back and collected a Munster Championship medal after a 0-19 to 0-18 defeat of Tipperary.

On 14 March 2009, Walsh made his first appearance for the Cork under-21 football team. He lined out at centre-back in a 1-17 to 0-09 defeat of Kerry. On 28 March, he won a Munster Championship medal after a 1-09 to 2-05 defeat of Tipperary in the final. Walsh was again at centre-back when Cork faced Down in the All-Ireland final on 4 May. He collected a winners' medal after a 1-13 to 2-09 victory. On 3 June, Walsh made his first appearance for the Cork under-21 team in a 2-22 to 0-25 defeat by Tipperary in the Munster Championship.

On 6 April 2011, Walsh was at midfield for the under-21 footballers when Cork faced Kerry in the Munster Championship final. He collected a second winners' medal after the 2-24 to 0-08 victory. On 3 August, Walsh was at left wing-forward for the Cork under-21 hurling team that faced Limerick in the Munster Championship final. He scored eight points from play in the 4-20 to 1-27 defeat.

Senior

Walsh made his first appearance for the Cork senior football team on 5 July 2009. He was introduced as a 59th-minute substitute for Ger Spillane in Cork's 2-06 to 0-11 defeat of Limerick in the Munster Championship final. It was his only appearance during the championship, however, he was an unused substitute for Cork's 0-16 to 1-09 defeat by Kerry in the All-Ireland final on 20 September.

On 25 April 2010, Walsh was at midfield for Cork's National League final against Mayo. He scored a point in the 1-17 to 0-12 victory. Walsh was also named at midfield for Cork's All-Ireland final meeting with Down on 19 September. He ended the game with a winners' medal after a 0-16 to 0-15 victory for Cork. Walsh ended the season by winning an All-Star award as well as being named Young Footballer of the Year.

After playing in the early rounds of the National League, Walsh won a second successive winners' medal on 24 April 2011 in spite of missing Cork's 0-21 to 2-14 defeat of Dublin in the final.

Walsh won his third National Football League medal on 29 April 2012. Lining out at full-forward he scored a vital goal when Cork defeated Mayo by 2-10 to 0-11 to win the title. On 8 July, Walsh top scored with 1-01 when Cork defeated Clare by 3-16 to 0-13 to win the Munster Championship. He ended the season by winning a second All-Star award.

In November 2013, Walsh announced that he would line out for both the Cork senior hurling and football teams during the 2014 season. He made his first appearance for the Cork senior hurling team on 15 February 2014 when he lined out at left wing-forward in Cork's 0-17 apiece draw with Limerick in the National League. On 3 July, Walsh won a Munster Championship medal after scoring two points from midfield in Cork's 2-24 to 0-24 defeat of Limerick in the last final to be played at the old Páirc Uí Chaoimh. 

On 30 October 2014, Walsh ended his status as a dual player and committed to playing only inter-county hurling during the 2015 season. On 3 May, he was at midfield for Cork's 1-24 to 0-17 defeat by Waterford in the National League final. 

Walsh remained with the Cork senior hurling team for the 2016 season as well, however, he rejoined the Cork senior football team in July 2016. At the end of the season he left the Cork senior hurling team and committed to the Cork senior football team for the 2017 season.

After leaving the Cork senior football team at the end of the 2018 season, Walsh announced his intention to make himself available to the Cork senior hurling team for 2019.

Career statistics

Honours

Team

Kanturk
 Cork Senior A Hurling Championship (1): 2021
All-Ireland Intermediate Club Hurling Championship (1): 2018
 Munster Intermediate Club Hurling Championship (1): 2017
 Cork Premier Intermediate Hurling Championship (1): 2017
 Cork Intermediate Football Championship (1): 2017
 Cork Intermediate Hurling Championship (1): 2013
 Cork Junior Football Championship (1): 2011

Cork
All-Ireland Senior Football Championship (1): 2010
Munster Senior Football Championship (2): 2009, 2012
Munster Senior Hurling Championship (1): 2014
National Football League (2): 2010, 2011, 2012
McGrath Cup (1): 2014
All-Ireland Under-21 Football Championship (1): 2009
Munster Under-21 Football Championship (2): 2009, 2011
Munster Minor Football Championship (1): 2007
Munster Minor Hurling Championship (1): 2008

Ireland
International Rules (2): 2011, 2013 (vc)

Individual

Awards
All Stars Young Footballer of the Year (1): 2010
All-Star (2): 2010, 2012
96fm/C103 Cork Sports Person of Year (1): 2009

References

External links
Aidan Walsh profile at the Cork GAA website

Living people
1990 births
Kanturk Gaelic footballers
Kanturk hurlers
All Stars Young Footballers of the Year
Cork inter-county Gaelic footballers
Cork inter-county hurlers
Dual players
Irish international rules football players
Winners of one All-Ireland medal (Gaelic football)
DCU Gaelic footballers